Tillandsia erici is a species in the genus Tillandsia. This species is endemic to Bolivia.

References

erici
Flora of Bolivia